Maria Lourdes Ciuró i Buldó (born 3 June 1971) is a Spanish lawyer and politician from Catalonia and a former member of the Congress of Deputies of Spain.

Early life
Ciuró was born on 3 June 1971 in Reus, Catalonia. She has a degree in law from the Autonomous University of Barcelona. Ciuró joined the Democratic Convergence of Catalonia (CDC) in 2003 and was a member its national council.

Career

Ciuró practised of law from 1994 to 2011, specialising in real estate and family law. She is a member of bar associations in Barcelona and Sabadell.

Ciuró contested the 2007 local elections as a Convergence and Union (CiU) electoral alliance candidate in Sabadell and was elected. She was re-elected at the 2011 local election. She contested the 2011 general election as a CiU candidate in the Province of Barcelona and was elected to the Congress of Deputies. She was re-elected at the 2015 and 2016 general elections.

At the 2017 regional election Ciuró was placed 57th on the Together for Catalonia (JxCat) alliance's list of candidates in the Province of Barcelona but the alliance only managed to win 17 seats in the province and as a result she failed to get elected. In July 2018 she was elected to the PDeCAT's executive directorate.

In February 2018 Ciuró won the nomination to be the Catalan European Democratic Party (PDeCAT)'s mayoral candidate in Sabadell at the 2019 local elections. She contested the 2019 local elections as a JxCat candidate in Sabadell and was re-elected though she did not become mayor.

Personal life
Ciuró is married with two children.

Electoral history

References

1971 births
Autonomous University of Barcelona alumni
Catalan European Democratic Party politicians
Lawyers from Catalonia
Women politicians from Catalonia
Women lawyers from Catalonia
Convergence and Union politicians
Democratic Convergence of Catalonia politicians
Living people
Members of the 10th Congress of Deputies (Spain)
Members of the 11th Congress of Deputies (Spain)
Members of the 12th Congress of Deputies (Spain)
Municipal councillors in the province of Barcelona
People from Sabadell
Together for Catalonia (2017) politicians
Women members of the Congress of Deputies (Spain)